James Hughes Miller (August 29, 1843 - June 27, 1890) was a lawyer and state legislator in Illinois. He served as Speaker of the Illinois House of Representatives. He was a Republican.

He was born in Marseilles, Ohio. He helped establish the Illinois State Historical Library.

He had a wife and four children. He abided his rule to never say anything bad about anyone living.

See also
Illinois State Historical Society

References

1843 births
1890 deaths